Maurice J. McDonough High School is a high school or secondary school in Pomfret, Maryland, United States and is run through the Charles County Public Schools system.  It has approximately 1,230 students and 80 employees.

The school, built in 1976,
is named for Maurice James McDonough, who was an early educator in Charles County, Maryland.

Sports
2A State football champions in 2010, coached by Luke Ethington.

Notes

External links

Public high schools in Maryland
Schools in Charles County, Maryland
Educational institutions established in 1977
1977 establishments in Maryland